These are the official results of the Men's Individual Pursuit at the 1992 Summer Olympics in Barcelona, Spain. The races were held on Monday, July 27, and Wednesday, July 29, 1992, at the Velòdrom d'Horta, with a race distance of 4 km. The Gold medal was won by Briton Chris Boardman, riding the Lotus 108 "superbike", who caught German Jens Lehmann in the final and won Britain's first cycling gold medal in 72 years.

Medalists

Results
Q Qualified for next round.
q Qualified for classification round.
ovtk Overtaken by opponent during heat.
cap captured opponent.
DNS Did not start.
WR New world record.

Qualifying round
Held, July 27

The thirty riders raced against each other in matches of two.  Qualification for the next round was not based on who won those matches, however.  The cyclists with the sixteen fastest times advanced, regardless of whether they won or lost their match.  Fastest eight times advanced to Group A quarter-finals. Places nine through sixteen advanced to Group B classification matches.

Quarter-finals
Held July 28
In the first round of actual match competition, cyclists were seeded into matches based on their times from the qualifying round.  The winners of the four heats of Group A advanced to the semi-finals.  Group B and the losers of heats in Group A were seeded.

Group B
Heat 1

Heat 2

Heat 3

Heat 4

Group A
Heat 1

Heat 2

Heat 3

Heat 4

Semi-finals
Held July 29
The winner of the two heats advance to the finals, for the gold medal.  The loser with the fastest semi-final time wins the bronze.

Heat 1

Heat 2

Final
Held July 29

Final classification

References

External links 
Official Olympic Report

M
Cycling at the Summer Olympics – Men's individual pursuit
Track cycling at the 1992 Summer Olympics
Men's events at the 1992 Summer Olympics